Sri Singha (Sanskrit:) was the teacher of Padmasambhava, Vimalamitra, and Vairotsana. He was a principal student and dharma-son of Mañjuśrīmitra in the Dzogchen lineage, and is credited by the Nyingma school with introducing Dzogchen to Tibet.

Life
Sri Singha is the son of King 'Accomplisher' and his wife queen Nantakā.

A.W. Barber notes that Sri Simha took the Atiyoga lineage to Andhra, in South India. He made his residence at Dhanyakataka. 

Thus, it would appear that Sri Simha took the Atiyoga line to Andhra and made his residence at the famous Dhanyakataka along the Krishna River. From here it was transmitted to teachers who then took the line to Tibet and China.

Achievements
Śrī Siṃha brought the Secret Mantra teachings from beneath the Vajra Throne in Bodhgaya to the 'Tree of Enlightenment' in China, where he concealed them in a pillar of the 'Auspicious Ten Thousand Gates Temple'.

Śrī Siṃha conferred the Eighteen Dzogchen Tantras (Tibetan: rdzogs chen rgyud bco brgyad) upon Padmasambhava. The eighteen are The Penetrating Sound Tantra (Tibetan: sgra thal ‘gyur), to which was appended the Seventeen Tantras of Innermost Luminosity (Tibetan: yang gsang 'od gsal gyi rgyud bcu bdun).

Kunsang, in rendering the instructions of Sri Singha to Padmasambhava, writes that:
In general, all phenomena belonging to samsara and nirvana are, from the very beginning, spontaneously perfected as the essence of awakened mind. However, because of failing to realize and not knowing this to be just how it is, sentient beings circle among the three realms and continue to wander among the six abodes. In order to guide them, it is generally said that an inconceivable number of doorways to the Dharma belonging to the various vehicles have been taught, but these can all be contained within development, completion and the Great Perfection.

Kunsang, in rendering the continued instructions of Sri Singha to Padmasambhava, outlines: 
...there are the three sections of the philosophical vehicles belonging to nirmanakaya, the three sections of Kriya and Yoga belonging to sam-bhogakaya, and the three aspects of development, completion and the Great Perfection belonging to dharmakaya. Among these, I shall explain to you the Ati Yoga of Instructions, distilling its quintessence, which is the Innermost Vajra Essence of the Unexcelled Fruition. So listen, Padmasambhava.

'Philosophical vehicles' (Tibetan: rgyu'i theg pa) in the abovementioned quotation denotes Theravada and Mahayana as different from Vajrayana.

Śrī Siṃha College
Śrī Siṃha College, founded by Gyalse Shenpen Thaye in 1848, is a Nyingmapa monastic college at Dzogchen Monastery in Kham in eastern Tibet.  Tradition holds that a manifestation of Sri Singha marked the spot for the location of the university, hence its name. Do Khyentse Yeshe Dorje consecrated the site laying the foundation stone with his phurba. The original college was destroyed by the Chinese in the late 1950s. The college began to be restored in 1980; the process continues today.

See also

References

Citations

Works cited

Further reading
Dudjom Rinpoche (1991). The Nyingma School of Tibetan Buddhism: Its Fundamentals and History. Translated by Gyurme Dorje and Matthew Kapstein. Boston: Wisdom Publications.
Nyoshul Khenpo Jamyang Dorjé. A Marvelous Garland of Rare Gems. Junction City: Padma Publishing, 2005.
Thondup, Tulku. Masters of Meditation and Miracles. Boston: Shambhala Publications, 1996.

External links 
Early treasure masters of the Great Perfection

Chinese scholars of Buddhism
Dzogchen lamas
Nyingma lamas
Tibetan Buddhists from China